Edgar French McClellan, Sr. (May 14, 1904 – April 30, 1972) was an American clergyman. From 1935 to 1972, he was the Pastor of Holy Temple Church of God in Christ in Buffalo, New York.

Early life
Born in Byhalia, Mississippi, McClellan was the only child of Henry McClellan and Zula Burton. He attended public school, and although his early formal education was limited, as an adult he earned a Doctorate of Divinity degree from Moody Bible Institute of Chicago.

Career
In 1930, McClellan was ordained by Bishop C. H. Mason, the founder of the Church of God in Christ. In 1934, he went to Buffalo, New York to conduct a revival at a small 
"storefront" church which was located at 501 Clinton Street and was known only as "501" or "501 Clinton." At the end of the revival, the church unanimously elected him pastor.  McClellan was inspired to name the church Holy Temple Church of God in Christ, which was the name of the church he had attended in Memphis, Tennessee.  In 1940 the congregation bought a building at 96 Spruce Street, a former firehouse, and held services there.  As the church continued to grow, a larger edifice was needed. They purchased a site at 572 Clinton Street on which to build a new church. In 1949, they marched from 96 Spruce Street to 572 Clinton Street, where they worshiped in the basement until the sanctuary was completed in 1952.  McClellan was the first African-American pastor in the city to build a church, as well as the first to have a weekly radio broadcast.

In the 1940s, McClellan served as Chaplain at the Erie County Penitentiary, known today as the Erie County Correctional Facility in Alden, New York.

McClellan was consecrated to the Bishopric and served as Assistant Bishop of the Western New York Second Jurisdiction of the Church of God in Christ.

Personal life
McClellan married Beatrice Huff in 1925, and they had ten children—four boys and six girls. After Beatrice's death in 1967, he married Rosie Marshall.

Death
E. F. McClellan Sr. died in an automobile accident April 30, 1972, at age 67.

Legacy
McClellan's youngest son, Franklin D. McClellan, is the Pastor of God's Temple of Grace in Buffalo, New York. His great-grandson, Earl McClellan, is the lead pastor of Shoreline City Church, a multi-site megachurch located in Dallas, Texas.

References

Church of God in Christ pastors
American bishops
1904 births
1972 deaths
Religious leaders from Buffalo, New York
Moody Bible Institute alumni